Arthur Richey Newbound (4 March 1886 – 31 August 1957) was an Australian rules footballer who played for the Fitzroy Football Club and St Kilda Football Club in the Victorian Football League (VFL).

Football

Fitzroy (VFL)

Bribery scandal
While playing with Fitzroy, Newbound was one of the five Fitzroy players that gave evidence to a special VFL inquiry into the allegations, revealed in the press a week earlier, that they had been offered cash inducements, by an (otherwise unknown) individual, to play "dead" in the 3 September 1910 match against South Melbourne, the result of which was vital for South Melbourne's final chances.

As a result of the comprehensive VFL inquiry, wherein the South Melbourne delegate advised the Inquiry that the football club had no connection with the offer, and that extensive enquiries had failed to reveal the identity of those making (and those behind the making of) the offer, and in which the Fitzroy footballers George Holden, "Boxer" Milne, Jack Cooper, and Newbound all gave "privileged" evidence (in that they "need[ed] not fear [the] consequences" of doing so). (Bill Walker, whose evidence matched that of Holden's, was not required to attend in person.

The Inquiry exonerated all five Fitzroy players, and released the following press statement on 28 September:
""That after hearing the evidence of the Fitzroy players, the league find that they were approached with the offer of trivial sums of money by certain men unknown to them, and whose identity the league have no means of ascertaining. The league consider the players are to be commended for their action in the matter."

St Kilda (VFL)
He played one First XVIII match for St Kilda, on 27 May 1911, against Melbourne, before being cleared to Fitzroy Juniors in July 1911.

Essendon A (VFA)
Cleared from St Kilda to Essendon A in the VFA in May 1912.

Northcote (VFA)
He was cleared from Essendon A to Northcote in May 1913.

Death
He died at the Alfred Hospital in Prahran, Victoria on 31 August 1957.

Notes

References
 
 The Fitzroy Team, The Weekly Times, (Saturday, 15 May 1909), p.26.
 Ross, J. (ed), 100 Years of Australian Football 1897–1996: The Complete Story of the AFL, All the Big Stories, All the Great Pictures, All the Champions, Every AFL Season Reported, Viking, (Ringwood), 1996.

External links 

 		
 
 Arthur Newbound, at The VFA Project (identified as "Arthur Charles 'Skelly' Newbound").
 Arthur Newbound, at Boyles Football Photos.

1886 births
1957 deaths
Australian rules footballers from Melbourne
Fitzroy Football Club players
St Kilda Football Club players
Essendon Association Football Club players
Northcote Football Club players
People from Collingwood, Victoria